Nikolaus Andreas von Katzler (also spelled Katzeler) (September 1696 – 10 November 1760) was a Prussian lieutenant general, Proprietor of the Gendarme Regiment, and Knight of the Black Eagle Order.  He was also the heir of the property at Grimminghausen.

Von Katzler was born in Maastricht. His name was included in 1851 on the Equestrian statue of Frederick the Great honoring the men considered to be the founders of the modern Prussian state. He died, aged 64, in Gardelegen.

Prussian military personnel of the Seven Years' War
1696 births
1760 deaths
People from Maastricht
Lieutenant generals of Prussia